In psychology, constructivism refers to many schools of thought that, though extraordinarily different in their techniques (applied in fields such as education and psychotherapy), are all connected by a common critique of previous standard approaches, and by shared assumptions about the active constructive nature of human knowledge. In particular, the critique is aimed at the "associationist" postulate of empiricism, "by which the mind is conceived as a passive system that gathers its contents from its environment and, through the act of knowing, produces a copy of the order of reality".

In contrast, "constructivism is an epistemological premise grounded on the assertion that, in the act of knowing, it is the human mind that actively gives meaning and order to that reality to which it is responding".
The constructivist psychologies theorize about and investigate how human beings create systems for meaningfully understanding their worlds and experiences.

In psychotherapy, for example, this approach could translate into a therapist asking questions that confront a client's worldview in an effort to expand his or her meaning-making habits. The assumption here is that clients encounter problems not because they have a mental disorder but in large part because of the way they frame their problems, or the way people make sense of events that occur in their life.

Constructivist psychology in education

Constructivist psychology when applied to education emphasizes that students are always engaged in a process of actively constructing meaning—a process which "the teacher can only facilitate or thwart, but not himself invent".

Jean Piaget's theory describes how children do not simply mimic everything that is part of the external environment, but rather that developing and learning is an ongoing process and interchange between individuals and their surroundings, a process through which individuals develop increasingly complex schemas. According to Angela O'Donnell and colleagues, constructivism describes how a learner constructs knowledge via different concepts: complex cognition, scaffolding, vicarious experiences, modeling, and observational learning. This makes students, teachers, the environment and anyone or anything else in which the student has interaction active participants in their learning.

Some constructivist theories

Genetic epistemology

Jean Piaget (1896–1980), the creator of genetic epistemology, argued that positions of knowledge are grown into; that they are not given a priori, as in Kant's epistemology, but rather that knowledge structures develop through interaction. In Behavior and Evolution, Piaget said that "behaviour is the motor of evolution". His major publications spanned fifty years from the 1920s to the 1970s. Piaget's approach to constructivism was further developed in neo-Piagetian theories of cognitive development.

Personal construct theory

George Kelly (1905–1967), the creator of personal construct theory, was concerned primarily with the epistemic role of the observer in interpreting reality. He argued that the way we expect to experience the world alters how we feel about it and act. In other words, we order ourselves by ordering our thoughts. The goal of his therapeutic approach was therefore to allow the client to explore their own minds, acting as a facilitator of the exploration of their own meanings, or "constructs". Kelly's major publications were published in the 1950s and 1960s.

Post-rationalist cognitive therapy

Vittorio Guidano (1944–1999), the creator of post-rationalist cognitive therapy, hypothesized that the mind creates a complex system of abstract rules responsible for the concrete and particular qualities of our conscious experience. His major publications were published in the 1980s and 1990s. In the years since Guidano's contributions, there has been much debate among embodied cognition researchers about to what degree cognition is abstract or amodal versus modal.

See also
Distributed cognition
Evolutionary epistemology
Genetic epistemology
Journal of Constructivist Psychology
Neuroconstructivism
Prospection

References

Further reading

Constructivism in education

Constructivism in psychotherapy

 
 
 
 
 
 
 
 
 

 
Personality theories